The Arvonia School, on S. Arvonia Road in Lebo, Kansas, was listed on the National Register of Historic Places in 2012.

It is notable as one of the earliest-known architect-designed schools in Kansas.  It was designed by architect John Haskell in 1872.

The school was closed in 1949.

It was built originally as a two-story building.

References

See also
Kansas one room school

School buildings on the National Register of Historic Places in Kansas
National Register of Historic Places in Osage County, Kansas
School buildings completed in 1872